Ringer Glacier is a glacier,  long, heading on the northeast flank of Saint Johns Range and flowing northeast to Miller Glacier, Victoria Land. Named in association with the distinctive ring-shaped moraine at its mouth, The Ringer. The name first appeared on a 1961 New Zealand map; approved by the Advisory Committee on Antarctic Names in 1995.
 

Glaciers of Victoria Land
Scott Coast